ZIZ Broadcasting Corporation commonly referred to as ZIZ, is the government-owned radio and (now cable-only) television service of Saint Kitts and Nevis. Its radio programming is broadcast on 555 AM, 95.9 & 96.1 FM, whilst the TV station formerly aired on channel 5 in St. Kitts and Channel 6 in Nevis.

External links 
Official site of ZIZ
Official site of ZIZ TV

References 

Communications in Saint Kitts and Nevis
Radio stations in the Caribbean
Television stations in the Caribbean
1961 establishments in Saint Kitts and Nevis
Radio stations established in 1961
Television in Saint Kitts and Nevis